The Goya Award for Best Picture is one of the Goya Awards, Spain's principal national film awards. The category was first awarded in 1986 to Fernando Fernán Gómez's drama film Voyage to Nowhere.

Several films that won or were nominated for this category also were nominated for the Academy Award for Best Foreign Language Film representing Spain, Women on the Verge of a Nervous Breakdown, Secrets of the Heart, The Grandfather and Pain and Glory were nominated while Belle Époque, All About My Mother and The Sea Inside won.
Argentine-Spanish productions The Secret in Their Eyes and Wild Tales also received a nomination in the category but representing Argentina, with the former winning. Mexican-Spanish film Pan's Labyrinth was nominated representing Mexico.

In the list below the winner of the award for each year is shown first, followed by the other nominees.

Winners and nominees

1980s

1990s

2000s

2010s

2020s

References

External links 
Official site
IMDb: Goya Awards

Film
Awards for best film